NGC 110 is an open star cluster located in the constellation Cassiopeia. It was discovered by the English astronomer John Herschel on October 29, 1831.

It is unknown if the members are physically related, or if the cluster exists at all. It is barely visible against the background sky, and the two dozen member stars seem to be at various distances. If the cluster does exist, it is at least 2,000 light years away.

References

External links
 

0110
Cassiopeia (constellation)
Astronomical objects discovered in 1831
Open clusters
Discoveries by John Herschel